Joe Waldron (born 1951 in Milltown, County Galway) is an Irish former sportsperson.  He played Gaelic football with his local club Milltown and was a member of the Galway senior inter-county team in the 1970s.

In 1972, Waldron captained Galway to win their first All-Ireland Under-21 Football Championship when they defeated Kerry in the final. He lost two consecutive All-Ireland Senior Football Championship Finals with Galway after being beaten by Cork in 1973 and Dublin the following year in 1974. He was a member of both of Milltown's Galway Senior Football Championship winning teams in 1971 and 1981, playing alongside his brother John in both finals.

Waldron was also a part of the successful UCD team of the early 1970s, winning a Sigerson Cup in 1972/73. This was the same all-conquering University team that won the Dublin SFC, Leinster Club SFC & All-Ireland Club SFC titles in the 1973/74 season.

On St. Patrick's Day, 1973, Waldron played on the Combined Universities football team that defeated his own native Connacht in the Railway Cup final, the only Universities team to win the Inter-Provincial Championship in football or hurling.

Waldron served as a selector for the Galway senior team in the early 1990s under John Tobin's management term.

Honours
Galway
Connacht Minor Football Championship : 1 (1969)
Connacht Under-21 Football Championship : 1 (1972; capt.)
All-Ireland Under 21 Football Championship : 1 (1972; capt.)
Connacht Senior Football Championship : 2 (1973, 1974)

Milltown
Galway Senior Football Championship : 2 (1971, 1981)
 Runner-up : 1 (1978)
Connacht Senior Club Football Championship Runner-up : 1 (1971)

UCD
Sigerson Cup : 1 (1972/73)
Dublin Senior Football Championship : 1 (1973)
Leinster Senior Club Football Championship : 1 (1973)
All-Ireland Senior Club Football Championship : 1 (1973/74)

Combined Universities
Railway Cup : 1 (1973)

References

1951 births
Living people
Galway inter-county Gaelic footballers
Milltown Gaelic footballers